The 1287–88 papal election (April 4 – February 22) was the deadliest papal election in the history of the Roman Catholic Church, with six (or five) of the sixteen (or fifteen) cardinal electors perishing during the deliberations. Eventually, the cardinals elected Girolamo Masci, O.Min. as Pope Nicholas IV, almost a year after the death of Pope Honorius IV, who died on April 3, 1287. Nicholas IV was the first Franciscan pope.

The cardinals' deaths are usually attributed to malaria. After the deaths of the six cardinals, the remaining electors—with the exception of Masci—left Rome and reassembled on 15 February 1288. When the Cardinals reassembled in February, 1288, there were seven electors left: Latino Malabranca, Bentivenga de Bentivengis, Girolamo Masci, Bernard de Languissel, Matteo Rosso Orsini, Giacomo Colonna, and Benedetto Caetani. Upon finding that Masci had remained at Santa Sabina in Rome the reassembled cardinals immediately elected him, but he refused until he was re-elected on February 22. It was thought at the time that Masci had survived by keeping a fire burning in his room to "purify" the pestilential vapors, or mal aria thought to cause the disease.

The election was held near Santa Sabina on Aventine Hill in the Savelli palace, Corte Savella, which Honorius IV had built and used as the de facto papal residence. According to Smith, Nicholas IV was, like his predecessor, "an undisguised partisan of the French interest" and "another example of the dishonest use of spiritual authority for political ends, by releasing Charles II of Naples from an inconvenient oath to Alfonso III of Aragon".

Cardinal electors

Notes

References
Bagliani, Agostino Paravincini, and Peterson, David S. 2000. The Pope's Body. University of Chicago Press. .
Brooke, Rosalind B. 2006. The Image of St Francis: Responses to Sainthood in the Thirteenth Century. Cambridge University Press. .
Darras, J. E., Spalding, M. J., and White, Charles Ignatius. 1898. A General History of the Catholic Church. P. J. Kennedy.
Smith, Philip. 1892. The History of the Christian Church. Harper & Bros.
Walsh, Michael J. 2003. The Conclave: A Sometimes Secret and Occasionally Bloody History of Papal Elections. Rowman & Littlefield. .

13th-century elections
1287
1288
1287
13th-century Catholicism
1287 in Europe
1288 in Europe